John William Cheshire (born 11 September 1947) is a British boxer. He fought as Johnny Cheshire and competed in the men's featherweight event at the 1968 Summer Olympics. At the 1968 Summer Olympics, he lost to Al Robinson of the United States.

He won the 1968 Amateur Boxing Association British featherweight title, when boxing out of the Repton ABC.

References

External links
 

1947 births
Living people
Scottish male boxers
British male boxers
Olympic boxers of Great Britain
Boxers at the 1968 Summer Olympics
Sportspeople from Ayr
Featherweight boxers